Pir Yusefian Rural District is a rural district (dehestan) in the Central District of Alborz County, Qazvin Province, Iran. At the 2006 census, its population was 9,427, in 2,237 families.  The rural district has 7 villages.

References 

Rural Districts of Qazvin Province
Alborz County